Emanuel Fernando Maciel (born 28 March 1997) is an Argentine professional footballer who plays as a midfielder for Aldosivi.

Career
San Lorenzo gave Maciel his beginnings in football, initially in their youth academy. He made a breakthrough into the first-team during 2018–19, as he was on the substitute's bench for two matches in league and cup. Juan Antonio Pizzi selected Maciel for his professional debut in July 2019, as he participated for the full ninety minutes of a Primera División home victory over Godoy Cruz at the Estadio Pedro Bidegain on 27 July. On 11 February 2020, Maciel signed with the Montreal Impact of Major League Soccer on a free transfer. He made his debut in a 4–3 defeat to Toronto FC in the MLS is Back Tournament on 16 July. Following the 2021 season, Maciel was released by Montréal.

On 21 January 2022, Maciel joined Argentine Primera División club Aldosivi on a deal until the end of 2024.

Career statistics
.

Notes

References

External links

1997 births
Living people
People from José C. Paz Partido
Argentine footballers
Association football midfielders
Argentine expatriate footballers
Expatriate soccer players in Canada
Argentine expatriate sportspeople in Canada
Argentine Primera División players
Major League Soccer players
San Lorenzo de Almagro footballers
CF Montréal players
Aldosivi footballers
Sportspeople from Buenos Aires Province